Sarah Dougherty (c.1818 – 7 November 1898) was a New Zealand community leader, nurse, boarding house keeper and gardener. She was born in Londonderry, Ireland on c.1818. Dougherty lived in Cutters Bay, Port Underwood during the Wairau Affray and afterwards in Wellington.

References

Further reading 

 Manson, C. (1974). The story of a New Zealand family : The beginnings. With a foreword by Cecil Manson. Whatamongo Bay, N.Z.: Cape Catley.
 Manson, C. (1981). Widow of Thorndon Quay : Part II of The story of a New Zealand family. Wellington [N.Z.]: Pigeon Press : distributed by Mallinson Rendel. 
 Greenaway, S., Brown, H., O'Flaherty, E., & Wojcik, P. (2000). Sarah and Daniel Dougherty and their descendants. Tauranga [N.Z.]: S. Greenaway. 

1810s births
1898 deaths
New Zealand nurses
New Zealand gardeners
Irish emigrants to New Zealand (before 1923)
People from County Londonderry
19th-century New Zealand people
New Zealand women nurses